Enos mazurka is a butterfly in the family Lycaenidae. It is found in Brazil (Amazon).

References

Butterflies described in 1867
Eumaeini
Lycaenidae of South America
Taxa named by William Chapman Hewitson